Cambria Heights High School is located at 426 Glendale Lake Road in Patton, Cambria County, Pennsylvania, United States. It is the sole high school operated by the Cambria Heights School District. In 2014, Cambria Heights High School enrollment was reported as 454 pupils in 9th through 12th grades. Cambria Heights High School employed 34 teachers. Cambria Heights High School students may choose to attend Admiral Peary Vocational-Technical School for training in the construction and mechanical trades, as well as other careers.

Cambria Heights High School serves the communities of: Carrolltown, Chest Springs, Hastings and Patton as well as Chest Township, Clearfield Township, East Carroll Township, Elder Township and West Carroll Township.

Extracurriculars
Cambria Heights School District offers a wide variety of clubs, activities and an extensive, publicly funded sports program. Eligibility for participation is determined by Cambria Heights School Board policies. The District is noncompliant with state law, due to failing to post its current Interscholastic Athletic Opportunities Disclosure Form on its website.

Athletics
The following athletics are offered at Cambria Heights:

Varsity Boys athletics
 Baseball - Class AA
 Basketball - Class AA
 Cross Country - Class A
 Football - Class A
 Soccer - Class A
 Swimming and Diving - Class AA
 Track and Field - Class AA
 Wrestling - Class AA

Girls athletics
 Basketball - Class AA
 Cross Country - Class A
 Soccer - Class A
 Softball - Class AA
 Swimming and Diving - Class AA
 Track and Field - Class AA
 Volleyball - Class AA

According to PIAA directory July 2015

References

Schools in Cambria County, Pennsylvania
Public high schools in Pennsylvania